This is a list of 282 species in Limnophila, a genus of limoniid crane flies in the family Limoniidae.

Limnophila species

 Limnophila abstrusa Alexander, 1929 c g
 Limnophila acuspinosa Alexander, 1931 c g
 Limnophila adicia Alexander, 1964 c g
 Limnophila adusta Osten Sacken, 1859 i
 Limnophila adustoides Alexander, 1927 i
 Limnophila aequiatra Alexander, 1949 i
 Limnophila albipes Leonard, 1913 i
 Limnophila albomanicata (Alexander, 1945) c g
 Limnophila aldrichi Alexander, 1927 i
 Limnophila aleator Alexander, 1945 i
 Limnophila aleutica Alexander, 1920 i
 Limnophila alleni Johnson, 1909 i
 Limnophila allosoma Speiser, 1908 c g
 Limnophila alpica Alexander, 1929 c g
 Limnophila amabilis Alexander, 1950 i
 Limnophila angularis Alexander, 1929 c g
 Limnophila angusticellula Alexander, 1931 c g
 Limnophila angustilineata Alexander, 1926 c g
 Limnophila angustior Alexander, 1919 i
 Limnophila angustula Alexander, 1929 i b
 Limnophila antennata Coquillett, 1905 i
 Limnophila antennella Alexander, 1929 c g
 Limnophila apiculata Alexander, 1919 i
 Limnophila aprilina Osten Sacken, 1859 i
 Limnophila araucania Alexander, 1928 c g
 Limnophila arnoudi Theowald, 1971 c g
 Limnophila aureola Skuse, 1890 c g
 Limnophila auripennis Alexander, 1926 i
 Limnophila austroalpina Alexander, 1929 c g
 Limnophila barberi Alexander, 1916 i
 Limnophila basalis (Walker, 1856) c g
 Limnophila bathrogramma Alexander, 1929 c g
 Limnophila benguetana Alexander, 1931 c g
 Limnophila bifida Alexander, 1921 i
 Limnophila bigladia Alexander, 1945 i c g
 Limnophila biterminata (Walker, 1856) i g
 Limnophila bituminosa Alexander, 1931 c g
 Limnophila bivittata Edwards, 1928 c g
 Limnophila bogongensis Alexander, 1929 c g
 Limnophila boharti Alexander, 1943 i
 Limnophila borchi Alexander, 1929 c g
 Limnophila brachyptera Alexander, 1931 c g
 Limnophila brevifilosa Alexander, 1959 i
 Limnophila brevifurca Osten Sacken, 1859 i
 Limnophila breviterebra Alexander, 1965 c g
 Limnophila brunneistigma Alexander, 1931 c g
 Limnophila bryanti Alexander, 1927 i c g
 Limnophila bryobia Mik, 1881 c g
 Limnophila buangensis Alexander, 1933 c g
 Limnophila burdicki Alexander, 1964 i
 Limnophila byersi Alexander, 1973 i c g
 Limnophila campbelliana Alexander, 1932 c g
 Limnophila cancellata Alexander, 1962 c g
 Limnophila canifrons Edwards, 1932 c
 Limnophila carteri Alexander, 1922 c g
 Limnophila casta Alexander, 1928 c g
 Limnophila caudifera Alexander, 1927 i g
 Limnophila celestissima (Alexander, 1945) c g
 Limnophila charis Alexander, 1955 c g
 Limnophila charon Alexander, 1937 c g
 Limnophila cherokeensis Alexander, 1940 i
 Limnophila chilensis Blanchard, 1852 c
 Limnophila chinggiskhani Podenas and Gelhaus, 2001 c g
 Limnophila cingulipes Alexander, 1928 c g
 Limnophila circumscripta Alexander, 1934 c g
 Limnophila claggi Alexander, 1930 i c g
 Limnophila clavigera Alexander, 1934 c g
 Limnophila colophallus Alexander, 1967 c g
 Limnophila columbiana Alexander, 1927 i
 Limnophila consimilis Deitz, 1921 i g
 Limnophila costata Coquillett, 1901 i
 Limnophila crepuscula Wood, 1952 c g
 Limnophila cressoni Alexander, 1917 i
 Limnophila decasbila (Wiedemann, 1828) c
 Limnophila defecta Alexander, 1929 c g
 Limnophila dictyoptera Alexander, 1922 c g
 Limnophila difficilis Alexander, 1920 c g
 Limnophila disposita Skuse, 1890 c g
 Limnophila dorrigana Alexander, 1933 c g
 Limnophila dravidica Alexander, 1971 c g
 Limnophila edentata Alexander, 1919 i
 Limnophila edita Alexander, 1928 c g
 Limnophila effeta Alexander, 1922 c g
 Limnophila egena Alexander, 1928 c g
 Limnophila electa (Alexander, 1924) c g
 Limnophila emmelina Alexander, 1914 i c g
 Limnophila epimicta Alexander, 1927 i
 Limnophila eutheta Alexander, 1936 c g
 Limnophila euxesta Alexander, 1924 i c g
 Limnophila expressa Alexander, 1937 c g
 Limnophila fasciolata Osten Sacken, 1869 i
 Limnophila filiformis Alexander, 1929 c g
 Limnophila flavapila Doane, 1900 i
 Limnophila flavicauda (Bigot, 1888) c
 Limnophila flavissima Alexander, 1960 c g
 Limnophila fratria Osten Sacken, 1869 i
 Limnophila freeborni Alexander, 1943 i
 Limnophila frosti Alexander, 1961 i
 Limnophila fumidicosta Alexander, 1927 i
 Limnophila fundata Alexander, 1928 c g
 Limnophila fuscovaria Osten Sacken, 1859 i b
 Limnophila fuscovenosa (Alexander, 1927) i g
 Limnophila galactopoda Alexander, 1943 i c
 Limnophila globulifera Alexander, 1941 i
 Limnophila grandidieri Alexander, 1920 c g
 Limnophila gruiformis Alexander, 1945 i
 Limnophila guttulatissima Alexander, 1913 c g
 Limnophila hemmingseniana (Alexander, 1978) c g
 Limnophila hepatica Alexander, 1919 i
 Limnophila hilli Alexander, 1929 c g
 Limnophila hoffmanniana Alexander, 1938 c g
 Limnophila humidicola Alexander, 1929 c g
 Limnophila imitatrix Skuse, 1890 c g
 Limnophila implicita Alexander, 1929 c g
 Limnophila inculta Alexander, 1929 c g
 Limnophila indistincta Doane, 1900 i
 Limnophila inordinata Skuse, 1890 c g
 Limnophila insularis Johnson, 1913 i
 Limnophila intonsa Alexander, 1928 c g
 Limnophila iota Alexander, 1964 c g
 Limnophila iotoides Alexander, 1968 c g
 Limnophila iowensis Alexander, 1927 i g
 Limnophila irene Alexander, 1927 i
 Limnophila irrorata Johnson, 1909 i
 Limnophila japonica Alexander, 1913 c g
 Limnophila johnsoni Alexander, 1914 i
 Limnophila jordanica Alexander, 1949 c g
 Limnophila jucunda Alexander, 1928 c g
 Limnophila kaieturana Alexander, 1930 c g
 Limnophila kershawi Alexander, 1928 c g
 Limnophila kerteszi Alexander, 1914 c g
 Limnophila laricicola Alexander, 1912 i c g
 Limnophila latistyla Alexander, 1923 c g
 Limnophila lepida Alexander, 1928 c g
 Limnophila leucostigma Alexander, 1937 c g
 Limnophila levidensis Skuse, 1890 c g
 Limnophila litigiosa Alexander, 1928 c g
 Limnophila lloydi Alexander, 1913 c g
 Limnophila lobifera Alexander, 1955 i c g
 Limnophila longicellula Alexander, 1931 c g
 Limnophila luctuosa Skuse, 1890 c g
 Limnophila lutea Doane, 1900 i
 Limnophila luteicauda Alexander, 1924 c g
 Limnophila luteifemorata Alexander, 1963 c g
 Limnophila luteola Alexander, 1927 i
 Limnophila macrocera (Say, 1823) i c g b
 Limnophila madida Alexander, 1928 c g
 Limnophila magdalena Dietz, 1920 i g
 Limnophila malagasya Alexander, 1920 c g
 Limnophila malitiosa (Alexander, 1951) c
 Limnophila manipurensis Alexander, 1942 c g
 Limnophila marchandi Alexander, 1916 i b
 Limnophila martynovi Alexander, 1933 c g
 Limnophila mcclureana Alexander, 1938 i
 Limnophila mcdunnoughi Alexander, 1926 i c g
 Limnophila melica Alexander, 1929 c g
 Limnophila micromera Alexander, 1979 c g
 Limnophila microphallus Alexander, 1927 i
 Limnophila micropriapus Alexander, 1981 c
 Limnophila mira Alexander, 1926 c g
 Limnophila mirabunda Alexander, 1928 c g
 Limnophila miroides Alexander, 1932 c g
 Limnophila mitocera Alexander, 1929 c g
 Limnophila mitoceroides Alexander, 1933 c g
 Limnophila modoc Alexander, 1946 i
 Limnophila morosa Alexander, 1928 c g
 Limnophila morula Alexander, 1928 c g
 Limnophila munda Osten Sacken, 1869 i
 Limnophila mundoides Alexander, 1916 i
 Limnophila neadusta Alexander, 1927 i
 Limnophila nearctica Alexander, 1966 i
 Limnophila nebulicola Alexander, 1929 c g
 Limnophila nebulifera Alexander, 1923 c g
 Limnophila nematocera (Alexander, 1939) c g
 Limnophila nemorivaga Alexander, 1929 c g
 Limnophila nevadensis Alexander, 1958 i
 Limnophila nigrofemorata Alexander, 1927 i c
 Limnophila nigrogeniculata Alexander, 1926 i
 Limnophila nitidiceps Alexander, 1928 c g
 Limnophila niveitarsis Osten Sacken, 1869 i
 Limnophila nixor Alexander, 1965 c g
 Limnophila nocticolor Alexander, 1929 c g
 Limnophila novaeangliae Alexander, 1914 i
 Limnophila novella Alexander, 1928 c g
 Limnophila nox Alexander, 1921 c g
 Limnophila nupta Alexander, 1947 i
 Limnophila nycteris Alexander, 1943 i c g
 Limnophila obscura Riedel, 1914 c g
 Limnophila obscuripennis Skuse, 1890 c g
 Limnophila occidens Alexander, 1924 i
 Limnophila ocellata Skuse, 1890 c g
 Limnophila oiticicai Alexander, 1948 c g
 Limnophila oliveri Alexander, 1923 c g
 Limnophila olympica Alexander, 1949 i
 Limnophila oregonensis Alexander, 1940 i
 Limnophila osceola Alexander, 1927 i
 Limnophila otwayensis Alexander, 1934 c g
 Limnophila pacalis Alexander, 1949 i
 Limnophila paeneadusta Alexander, 1961 i
 Limnophila pallidistyla Alexander, 1934 c g
 Limnophila paramunda Alexander, 1949 i
 Limnophila pauciseta Alexander, 1924 c g
 Limnophila pectinifera Alexander, 1964 c
 Limnophila penana Alexander, 1967 c g
 Limnophila pergracilis Alexander, 1943 c g
 Limnophila perscita Alexander, 1926 c g
 Limnophila persimilis Alexander, 1927 i g
 Limnophila phorophragma Alexander, 1944 i
 Limnophila pictipennis (Meigen, 1818) c g
 Limnophila pilosipennis Alexander, 1922 c g
 Limnophila platyna Alexander, 1952 c g
 Limnophila platyphallus Alexander, 1926 i
 Limnophila poetica Osten Sacken, 1869 i c g
 Limnophila politissima Alexander, 1941 i
 Limnophila politostriata Alexander, 1934 c g
 Limnophila polymoroides Alexander, 1929 c g
 Limnophila procella Alexander, 1944 c g
 Limnophila pullipes Alexander, 1938 c g
 Limnophila quaesita Alexander, 1923 c g
 Limnophila recedens Alexander, 1931 c g
 Limnophila recta Alexander, 1928 c g
 Limnophila referta Alexander, 1928 c g
 Limnophila reniformis Alexander, 1934 c g
 Limnophila roraima Alexander, 1931 c g
 Limnophila roraimicola Alexander, 1931 c g
 Limnophila rubecula Alexander, 1944 c g
 Limnophila rubida Alexander, 1924 i c g
 Limnophila rudimentis Alexander, 1941 i
 Limnophila rufibasis (Osten Sacken) i g b
 Limnophila sabrina Alexander, 1929 i
 Limnophila schadei Alexander, 1926 c g
 Limnophila schranki Oosterbroek, 1992 c g
 Limnophila scitula Alexander, 1926 c g
 Limnophila semifacta Alexander, 1948 i
 Limnophila sequoiarum Alexander, 1943 i
 Limnophila serena Alexander, 1928 c g
 Limnophila serotinella Alexander, 1926 i
 Limnophila seticellula Alexander, 1938 i
 Limnophila shannoni Alexander, 1921 i
 Limnophila shikokuensis Alexander, 1953 c g
 Limnophila sikorai Alexander, 1921 c g
 Limnophila similis Alexander, 1911 i
 Limnophila simplex Alexander, 1911 i
 Limnophila siouana Alexander, 1929 i
 Limnophila snoqualmiensis Alexander, 1945 i
 Limnophila soldatovi Alexander, 1934 c g
 Limnophila solstitialis Alexander, 1926 i
 Limnophila spinulosa Alexander, 1946 c g
 Limnophila stuckenbergiana Alexander, 1965 c g
 Limnophila stupkai Alexander, 1940 i
 Limnophila subapterogyne Alexander, 1928 c g
 Limnophila subcostata (Alexander, 1911) i c g
 Limnophila subcylindrica Alexander, 1928 c g
 Limnophila subguttularis Alexander, 1932 c g
 Limnophila subjucunda Alexander, 1928 c g
 Limnophila subpilosa Edwards, 1928 c
 Limnophila subsimilis Alexander, 1927 i
 Limnophila subtenuicornis (Alexander, 1918) i c g
 Limnophila subtristis Alexander, 1928 c g
 Limnophila superlineata Doane, 1900 i
 Limnophila suspecta Alexander, 1928 c g
 Limnophila tasioceroides Alexander, 1933 c g
 Limnophila tenuicornis Osten Sacken, 1869 i c g
 Limnophila tepida Alexander, 1926 i
 Limnophila terebrans Alexander, 1916 i
 Limnophila terraenovae Alexander, 1916 i
 Limnophila tetonicola Alexander, 1945 i c g
 Limnophila theresiae Alexander, 1945 c g
 Limnophila tigriventris Alexander, 1928 c g
 Limnophila tonnoiri Alexander, 1926 c g
 Limnophila undulata Bellardi, 1862 i c g
 Limnophila unispinifera Alexander, 1955 c g
 Limnophila vancouverensis Alexander, 1943 i
 Limnophila varicornis Coquillett, 1898 c g
 Limnophila velitor Alexander, 1951 c g
 Limnophila vera Alexander, 1933 c g
 Limnophila vernata Alexander, 1927 i
 Limnophila vicaria (Walker, 1835) c g
 Limnophila walleyi Alexander, 1929 i
 Limnophila wolffhuegeli Alexander, 1940 c g
 Limnophila woodgatei Alexander, 1946 i
 Limnophila woodiana Alexander, 1964 c g

Data sources: i = ITIS, c = Catalogue of Life, g = GBIF, b = Bugguide.net

References